The T. F. Much Ballroom or Too Fucking Much Ballroom was a music and cultural institution in Melbourne from 1970 to 1974. The venue was promoted by Bani McSpedden and John Pinder, initially to raise money for a Carlton youth club. Its successors were Much More Ballroom and Stoned Again.

History 

The full name of the music venue was Too Fucking Much Ballroom, which was usually abbreviated to T. F. Much Ballroom, and began in 1970 at Central Hall in Brunswick Street, Fitzroy with Bani McSpedden and John Pinder as promoters. Later incarnations included the Much More Ballroom, and Stoned Again.

Bands which frequently performed at the venue were Sons of the Vegetal Mother (and its offshoot, Daddy Cool), Spectrum (and its offshoot, Indelible Murtceps), and Tamam Shud. Solo artists included the wizard-like magician, Jeff Krozier (Crozier), the blues and soul singer, Wendy Saddington, and Australia's first synthesiser performer, Steve Dunstan.

According to Duncan Kimball of MilesAgo website, "events were usually held monthly and typically featured long concert-style performances, with multiple musical acts on the bill, interspersed with comedy, poetry readings, theatrical, dance and novelty performances."

Pinder later described the hall, "it belonged to the Catholic Church. And in fact, it was the sort of hall for the Catholic Cathedral. And I think they had no idea what we were up to. But I used pay the rent to whatever they call the office of the Archbishop of Melbourne."

Central Hall became part of the Australian Catholic University's St. Patrick campus. As from March 2012 the original ballroom still existed, and was used for some university functions.

See also

 Brunswick Street, Melbourne

References

External links

Website of Spectrum members Mike Rudd and Bill Putt, with information on T.F. Much Ballroom

Former music venues in Australia
Music venues in Melbourne
Ballrooms in Australia